Al-Faisaly (الفيصلي) may refer to:

Al-Faisaly SC, a football club based in Amman, Jordan
Al-Faisaly FC, a football club based in Harmah, Saudi Arabia